1163 Saga, provisional designation , is a background asteroid from the outer regions of the asteroid belt, approximately 32 kilometers in diameter. It was discovered on 20 January 1930, by astronomer Karl Reinmuth at the Heidelberg-Königstuhl State Observatory in southwest Germany. The asteroid was named after the Sagas, a collection of stories from Norse mythology.

Orbit and classification 

Saga is a background that does not belong to any known asteroid family. It orbits the Sun in the outer main-belt at a distance of 3.1–3.4 AU once every 5 years and 9 months (2,112 days). Its orbit has an eccentricity of 0.05 and an inclination of 9° with respect to the ecliptic. The body's observation arc begins at Heidelberg, six weeks after its official discovery observation.

Physical characteristics 

Saga is an assumed S-type asteroid, with a large range of measured albedos indicating otherwise (see below).

Rotation period 

Since 2006, three rotational lightcurves of Saga were obtained from photometric observations by French amateur astronomers Laurent Bernasconi and René Roy, as well as by astronomers at the Palomar Transient Factory in California. Lightcurve analysis gave a rotation period between 9.278 and 9.394 hours with a brightness amplitude of 0.25 to 0.33 magnitude.

Diameter and albedo 

According to the surveys carried out by the Infrared Astronomical Satellite IRAS, the Japanese Akari satellite and the NEOWISE mission of NASA's Wide-field Infrared Survey Explorer, Saga measures between 26.29 and 38.113 kilometers in diameter and its surface has an albedo between 0.0640 and 0.147.

The Collaborative Asteroid Lightcurve Link derives an albedo of 0.1199 and adopts a diameter of 29.11 kilometers from IRAS with an absolute magnitude of 10.6.

Naming 

This minor planet was named after the Sagas, a collection of prose Norse mythological stories of ancient Scandinavian and Germanic history. It includes the early Viking voyages and is mostly written in Old Icelandic (Old Norse). The official naming citation was mentioned in The Names of the Minor Planets by Paul Herget in 1955.

References

External links 
 Asteroid Lightcurve Database (LCDB), query form (info )
 Dictionary of Minor Planet Names, Google books
 Asteroids and comets rotation curves, CdR – Observatoire de Genève, Raoul Behrend
 Discovery Circumstances: Numbered Minor Planets (1)-(5000) – Minor Planet Center
 
 

001163
Discoveries by Karl Wilhelm Reinmuth
Named minor planets
19300120